Sir Derek Jack Mitchell KCB CVO (5 March 1922 - 16 August 2009) was a British civil servant who served as Principal Private Secretary to the Prime Minister between 1964 and 1966, and Second Permanent Secretary at Her Majesty's Treasury between 1973 and 1977.

References 

1922 births
2009 deaths
British civil servants
Companions of the Order of the Bath
Knights Commander of the Order of the Bath
Commanders of the Royal Victorian Order

External links 

 Mitchell's entry in Who's Who